The family Cliidae is a taxonomic group of small floating sea snails, pelagic marine opisthobranch gastropod mollusks.

This family name has for a long time been known as Clioidae, or the subfamily Clioinae Jeffreys, 1869 belonging to the family Cavoliniidae, each time with the type genus Clio Linnaeus, 1767. Unfortunately this is often confused with another molluscan family Clionidae, which has the type genus Clione. The International Commission on Zoological Nomenclature (ICZN) has therefore changed the name back to its original spelling Cliidae Jeffreys, 1869, type genus Clio Linnaeus, 1767

Genera
 Clio Linnaeus, 1767
Genera brought into synonymy
 Balantium Children, 1823: synonym of Clio (Balantium) Children, 1823 represented as Clio Linnaeus, 1767
 Cleodora Peron & Lesueur, 1810: synonym of Clio Linnaeus, 1767
 Euclio Bonnevie, 1912: synonym of Clio Linnaeus, 1767

References

 Bouchet P. & Rocroi J.-P. (2005) Classification and nomenclator of gastropod families. Malacologia 47(1-2): 1-397.
  Rampal J. (2002). Biodiversité et biogéographie chez les Cavoliniidae (Mollusca, Gastropoda, Opisthobranchia, Euthecosomata). Régions faunistiques marines. Zoosystema : 24(2): 209-258

Euopisthobranchia
Cavolinioidea